Harvey High School is a grades 6-12 school located in York County, New Brunswick. Harvey High School is in the Anglophone West School District.

See also
 List of schools in New Brunswick
 Anglophone West School District

References

Schools in York County, New Brunswick
High schools in New Brunswick
Middle schools in New Brunswick